The  Romania lunar sample displays are two commemorative plaques consisting of small fragments of Moon specimen brought back with the Apollo 11 and Apollo 17 lunar missions and given in the 1970s to the people of Romania by United States President Richard Nixon as goodwill gifts.

Description

Apollo 11

Apollo 17

History 

The Romania Apollo 11 lunar sample display held by Nicolae Ceaușescu is at the National History Museum in Bucharest.

Joseph Gutheinz students found that the Apollo 17 "goodwill Moon rocks" may have been auctioned.

See also
 List of Apollo lunar sample displays

References

Further reading

External links
 Partial list of Apollo  11, 12, 14, 15, 16, and 17 sample locations, NASA Johnson Space Center

Stolen and missing moon rocks
Romania–United States relations
Tourist attractions in Romania